Kalkudah or Kalkuda (Pronounced Kal-Kuda, Tamil translation rock-bay) is a coastal resort town located about 35 kilometers northwest of Batticaloa, Batticaloa District, Sri Lanka.  It used to be a popular tourist destination, however due to 2004 Indian Ocean Tsunami and Sri Lankan Civil War tourist numbers have declined. Pasikudah and Kalkudah are located few kilometers apart.

In recent time, Kalkudah receives plenty of visitors to Pasikudah beach.

Twin cities
  Nuremberg, Bavaria, Germany

See also

Pasikudah
Arugam Bay - Ampara District
Nilaveli - Trincomalee District

References 

Seaside resorts in Sri Lanka
Towns in Batticaloa District
Manmunai West DS Division